BRDM-2 (EST) is an Estonian version of the BRDM-2, a 4x4 wheeled armored personnel carrier (APC) designed in the Soviet Union.

History
After Estonia re-gained independence in 1991, it used 7 BRDM-2 (BRDM - Combat Reconnaissance/Patrol Vehicle). These were replaced by Mamba APC and Sisu XA-180 APCs.

At least one BRDM-2 is used by the Estonian police. In the fall of 2008, a BRDM-2 was sold, without armament, in an internet auction. One more BRDM-2 is in a military museum, together with a T-34 and a BTR-60.

References

External links
 http://www.sodur.com/index.php?option=com_content&view=article&id=83&Itemid=108 (in Estonian)
 http://www.muuseum.pv.ee/index.php?option=com_datsogallery&Itemid=10&func=detail&id=134 Military museum in Valga

Military equipment of Estonia